The Lontar Foundation, a not-for-profit organization based in Jakarta, Indonesia, was founded in 1987 by four Indonesian writers: Goenawan Mohamad, Sapardi Djoko Damono, Umar Kayam, and Subagio Sastrowardoyo, and the American translator John H. McGlynn.

Background
The foundation is an independent organization, neither affiliated with nor intended to promote the interests of any particular political cause or group. Its core activity is the translation and publication of Indonesian literary works whose long-term goals are:

 To stimulate the further development of Indonesian literature;
 To make Indonesian literature accessible to an international audience; and
 To preserve for future generations Indonesia's literary record.

One of Lontar's most noted works is Illuminations: The Writing Traditions of Indonesia: Featuring Manuscripts from the National Library of Indonesia. According to Associate Professor Jean Gelman Taylor from the University of New South Wales, "Wetherhill and the Lontar Foundation have made a major contribution to scholarship by bringing together in one book these samples of Indonesia's intellectual and artistic heritage."

Lontar also published Indonesia in the Soeharto Years: Issues, Incidents and images written by John H. McGlynn and a large number of other writers. According to Katharine McGregor, Senior Lecturer in Southeast Asian History at the University of Melbourne, "[a] strength of the work is the rich collection of photographs which document key protests, acts of violence, street life and Indonesian protest art."

In 2010, the Lontar Foundation published the Lontar Anthology of Indonesian Drama, the first anthology of Indonesian drama translated into English, featuring a diverse group of translators such as Harry Aveling, an authority on Indonesian and Malay literature, among others. In May 2011, the Lontar Foundation launched a new series of Indonesian literature translated into English called the Modern Library of Indonesia, featuring works from the 1920s until the present, including authors such as Putu Wijaya and Dewi Lestari. According to Tempo, "[Lontar] has inarguably become Indonesia's foremost literary foundation, and now has under its belt an impressive collection of translated literary works, from prose to poetry to drama."

Selected publications

See also

References

External links
 "About Lontar". The Lontar Foundation. Retrieved 31 August 2010.
 Lontar Foundation Ready to Embrace Future Challenges—The Jakarta Post
 
 

Arts organizations established in 1987
Book publishing companies of Indonesia
Foundations based in Indonesia
Indonesian literature